The Secure Rural Schools and Community Self-Determination Act of 2000 was a bill passed into law by the United States Congress on October 30, 2000. The law amended the United States Forest Service's county payments program for FY2001-FY2006 to allow states or counties to choose to receive the average of the three highest payments for FY1986-FY1999 in lieu of the regular 25% payment, but requiring that 15–20% of those payments be used by the counties for specified purposes, in accordance with recommendations of resource advisory committees for projects on federal lands, or returned to the Treasury.

The Forest Service county payments should not be confused with Bureau of Land Management "payments in lieu of taxes."

The Act originally expired in 2006 and has been renewed several times (most recently in 2015) each time at reduced spending levels.

See also
Oregon and California Railroad Revested Lands

References 

United States federal agriculture legislation
Land use in Oregon
Acts of the 106th United States Congress